1992 ACC tournament may refer to:

 1992 ACC men's basketball tournament
 1992 ACC women's basketball tournament
 1992 ACC men's soccer tournament
 1992 ACC women's soccer tournament
 1992 Atlantic Coast Conference baseball tournament
 1992 Atlantic Coast Conference softball tournament